Marco Durante (born in 1965 in Naples, Italy) is an Italian physicist, recognized as an expert in the fields of radiobiology and medical physics in charged particle therapy.

During his career, Marco Durante gained extensive experience in the biophysics of heavy ions and space radiation protection performing experiments in top-level institutes all over the world. He developed a new method for biodosimetry of charged particles in order to estimate the late risks of patient undergoing radiotherapy, as well as to predict the consequences of long-term exposures for the astronauts. Concerning space research, he also developed  a technique to evaluate the shielding effectiveness of different materials using high-energy ions.
Full professor at the Technical University of Darmstadt, Marco Durante is President of the Particle Therapy Co-Operative Group (PTCOG)  from July 2022 and previously served in the European Space Agency (ESA) Life Sciences Advisory Group, in the Human Exploration Science Advisory Committee (HESAC) and in the Program Advisory Committees of the GANIL center  (France) and KVI Center for Advanced Radiation Technology  (Netherlands) particle accelerators. He is currently Director of the  Biophysics Department of GSI Helmholtz Centre for Heavy Ion Research, and is responsible for the Biophysics research in the future FAIR  accelerator in Darmstadt. He was previously director of  TIFPA  in Trento and is a member of the Scientific Committee of the Italian National Centre of Oncological Hadrontherapy  (CNAO, Pavia, Italy).

Biography 
After studying Physics, in 1992 Marco Durante got his PhD in Radiation Biophysics at the University of Naples Federico II with a fellowship at the Lawrence Berkeley National Laboratory. He made his first post doc in NASA Johnson Space Center (TX, USA)  and in 1997 a second post doc at the National Institute of Radiological Sciences (Japan). 
He has been associate professor at the University of Naples Federico II for 15 years. From January 2006 he is adjunct professor at the Temple University and from November 2008 he is full professor of physics at the Technical University of Darmstadt. In October 2007 he became director of the  Biophysics Department of GSI Helmholtz Centre for Heavy Ion Research taking over from Gerhard Kraft.

During his studies he developed strong interest in charged particle therapy, cosmic radiation, radiation cytogenetics, radiation biophysics. With his research, he gave outstanding contributions in radiation biophysics.
Currently, Marco Durante research efforts are directed toward the optimization of charged particle therapy, mainly focusing on reducing the costs and increasing the benefits of this treatment. Concerning radiation risk during space exploration, Marco Durante is involved in experimental and theoretical studies aiming at the improvement of the risk assessment.
He is recipient of a 2020 European Research Council Advanced Grant on radioactive ion beams in radiotherapy  (BARB).

Awards 
 Radiation Research Society 2020 Gioacchino Failla award 
 Galileo Galilei prize from the European Federation of Organizations for Medical Physics (2005). 
 60th Timofeeff-Ressovsky medal by the Russian Academy of Sciences (2010).
 8th Warren K. Sinclair Award of the US National Academy of Sciences (2011).
 IBA-Europhysics award for Applied Nuclear Science and Nuclear Methods in Medicine from the European Physics Society (2013).
 Bacq & Alexander award of the European Radiation Research Society 2013 (ERRS).

Publications
Marco Durante is co-author of over 450 papers in peer-reviewed scientific journals (h-index=52), including high-impact factor reviews on Nature Journal, Lancet Oncology, PNAS, and Reviews of Modern Physics, and is member of the Editorial Board of several of them.

Selected Recent Publications:
 Cucinotta FA., Durante M. Cancer risk from exposure to galactic cosmic rays: implications for space exploration by human beings Lancet Oncol. 7 (2006) 431-435 
 Durante M., Cucinotta FA. Heavy ion carcinogenesis and human space exploration Nat. Rev. Cancer 8 (2008) 465-472.
 Jakob B., Splinter J., Durante M., Taucher-Scholz G. Live cell microscopy analysis of radiation-induced DNA double-strand break motion Proc. Natl. Acad. Sci. USA 106 (2009) 3172-3177.
 Durante M., Loeffler JS. Charged particles in radiation oncology Nat. Rev. Clin. Oncol. 7 (2010) 37- 43.
 Newhauser WD., Durante M. Assessing the risk of second malignancies after modern radiotherapy Nat. Rev. Cancer 11 (2011) 438-448.
 Durante M., Cucinotta FA. Physical basis of radiation protection in space travel Rev. Mod. Phys. 83 (2011) 1245-1281.
 Pignalosa D., Durante M. Overcoming resistance of cancer stem cells Lancet Oncol. 13 (2012) e187- e188.
 Loeffler JS., Durante M. Charged particle therapy - optimization, challenges and future directions Nat. Rev. Clin. Oncol. 10 (2013) 411-424.
 Durante M., Reppingen N., Held KD. Immunologically augmented cancer treatment using modern radiotherapy Trends Mol. Med. 19 (2013) 565-582.

References

 TU Darmstadt
 Cosmic Radiation - a showstopper for space exploration?: Marco Durante at TEDxRheinMain
 Interview with Prof. Marco Durante and his research on cosmic radiation during spaceflight

External links 
 GSI Biophysics
 National Institute of Radiological Sciences
 Heidelberger Ionenstrahltherapiezentrum
 Centro Nazionale di Adroterapia Oncologica CNAO
 TIFPA: Trento Institute for Pure and Applied Physics
 The International Association for Radiation Research IARR
 PTCOG: Particle Therapy Co-Operative Group

1965 births
21st-century Italian physicists
University of Naples Federico II alumni
Lawrence Berkeley National Laboratory people
Academic staff of the University of Naples Federico II
Temple University faculty
Scientists from Naples
Living people
Academic staff of Technische Universität Darmstadt